The Ever Presents are a group of people who have run the London Marathon at each event since the first event in 1981. In 1995 the group was first recognised with 42 members. A person is considered to no longer be an Ever Present if they do not run the race in a given year. After the 2021 race, there were seven remaining members of the group.

The group's youngest member is Chris Finill who, from 1981 to 2013, completed every race in under 3 hours, earning a Guinness World Record for this consistent high performance.

Members

Original members 
The group was first acknowledged in 1995 after the 15th marathon with 42 members who had run each event.

 — no longer a member
 — still a member

Current members 
The following seven people ran and completed every London Marathon up to and including the most recent event (the 2021 London Marathon). 
The 2020 London Marathon was an elite-only event, with non-elite runners — including all ten then-Ever Presents — participating "virtually". Kenneth Jones' participation in the 2021 event was also virtual.

References

Footnotes

External links 

London Marathon